Tristain may refer to:
Tristain kingdom
Tristán